Work Like Any Other is a 2016 debut novel by Virginia Reeves. Set in the 1920s, it narrates the story of a poor electrician who siphons energy from his town's electricity source to save his family from poverty. In July 2016 the book was longlisted for the 2016 Man Booker Prize.

References

2016 American novels
2016 debut novels
Charles Scribner's Sons books